Byashim Yusupovich Nurali (1900–1965) was a Turkmen primitive painter active during Soviet times. One of the first Turkmen painters, he was killed in an air crash. Nurali was also an art teacher. His works can be found in the Saparmurat Turkmenbashi Fine Arts Museum in Ashgabat.

References
Biography

1900 births
1965 deaths
Soviet painters
Victims of aviation accidents or incidents in the Soviet Union
20th-century Turkmenistan painters